Sergei Vladimirovich Ilyushin (born 27 March 1975) is a Russian former professional footballer.

Club career
He made his professional debut in the Russian First Division in 2002 for FC Torpedo Volzhsky.

Honours
 Russian Premier League runner-up: 1997.
 Russian Premier League bronze: 1996.

European club competitions
With FC Rotor Volgograd.

 UEFA Cup 1995–96: 3 games.
 UEFA Intertoto Cup 1996: 3 games.

References

1975 births
People from Volzhsky, Volgograd Oblast
Living people
Russian footballers
Russia under-21 international footballers
Russian Premier League players
Russian expatriate footballers
Expatriate footballers in Kazakhstan
FC Energiya Volzhsky players
FC Rotor Volgograd players
Russian expatriate sportspeople in Kazakhstan
FC Mordovia Saransk players
FC Arsenal Tula players
FC Zhenis Astana players
Association football midfielders
FC Spartak Nizhny Novgorod players
Sportspeople from Volgograd Oblast